Maxime Guyon (born 7 May 1989) is a French flat racing jockey, who debuted at 2005. In 2008, he received a professional license and won first group one at the Grand Prix de Paris. In 2010, he won races in the United Kingdom, Japan and Hong Kong. Since 2015, he is a retained jockey for Wertheimer et Frère, succeeding Olivier Peslier in the role.

In Hong Kong he made an immediate impact in a short stint with 15 victories that won him second place in the Most Popular Jockey of the Year in 2010/11 season.

Major wins
 France
 Critérium de Saint-Cloud - (2) - Mandaen (2011), Morandi (2012)
 Grand Prix de Paris - (3) - Cavalryman (2009), Meandre (2011), Flintshire (2013)
 Grand Prix de Saint-Cloud - (2) - Meandre (2012), Silverwave (2016)
 Poule d'Essai des Poulains - (1) - Lope de Vega (2010)
 Poule d'Essai des Pouliches - (1) - Dream And Do (2020)
 Prix de Diane - (1) - Golden Lilac (2011)
 Prix d'Ispahan - (2) - Golden Lilac (2012), Solow (2015)
 Prix Jean Prat - (2) - Mutual Trust (2011), Aesop's Fables (2012)
 Prix Jean Romanet - (2) - Announce (2011), Romantica (2013)
 Prix du Jockey Club - (1) - Lope de Vega (2010)
 Prix de l'Opéra - (2) - Shalanaya (2009), Rougir (2021)
 Prix Royal-Oak - (1) - Be Fabulous (2011)
 Prix Saint-Alary - (1) - Queen's Jewel (2015)
 Prix Vermeille - (2) - Baltic Baroness (2014), Left Hand (2016)
 Prix Ganay - (1) - Cutlass Bay (2010)
 Prix Maurice de Gheest - (1) - Polydream (2018)

 Germany
 Grosser Preis von Berlin - (1) - Meandre (2012)

 United Kingdom
 Prince of Wales's Stakes - (1) - Byword (2010)
 1,000 Guineas - (1) - Miss France (2014)
 Queen Anne Stakes - (1) - Solow (2015)
 Queen Elizabeth II Stakes - (1) - Solow (2015)
 Sussex Stakes - (1) - Solow (2015)

 Hong Kong
 Hong Kong Classic Cup - (1) - Ambitious Dragon (2011)
 Hong Kong Derby - (1) - Ambitious Dragon (2011)
 Hong Kong Vase - (1) - Flintshire (2014)

 Italy
 Premio Vittorio di Capua - (1) - Shamalgan (2013)

 United Arab Emirates
 Dubai Turf - (1) - Solow (2015)

Performance

References

The Hong Kong Jockey Club

Hong Kong jockeys
1989 births
Living people
French jockeys